Lassner is a surname. Notable people with the surname include:

 Andy Lassner (born 1966), American television producer
David Lassner (born 1954), American computer scientist and academic administrator
 Jacob Lassner, American academic and writer